Jean Pellissier may refer to:* Jean Pierre Pellissier (1808–1867), missionary from the Paris Mission Society to Southern Africa
 Jean Pellissier (shepherd), shepherd in the Comté de Foix
 Jean Pellissier (ski mountaineer) (born 1972), Italian ski mountaineer